Stenocereus thurberi, the organ pipe cactus, is a species of cactus native to Mexico and the United States. The species is found in rocky desert. Two subspecies are recognized based on their distribution and height. The Organ Pipe Cactus National Monument is named for the species.

Its English common name is derived from its resemblance to a pipe organ. It is locally known as pitaya dulce, Spanish for "sweet pitaya" or sweet cactus fruit.

Description
This cactus species has several narrow stems that rise vertically, growing from a single short trunk just above the ground level. These stems rarely branch but rather grow annually from the tip of the last growth. It takes 150 years to reach maturity. The older plants produce  funnel-shaped white flowers annually which are open at night and close by the morning and have a purple or pink tint to them. These usually grow during April, May, and June. The organ pipe cactus is usually pollinated by bats. The plant also produces fruit about the size of a tennis ball. Beneath the fruit's spiny exterior is red flesh that has been described as tasting better than watermelon. This fruit has traditionally been harvested by the Seris, who call the plant ool , and is used as a medicine.

Distribution
This species is found mostly in Mexico, mainly in Sonora and southern Baja California and Northern Sinaloa. It is also known to the United States, but is much rarer, with the notable exception of Organ Pipe Cactus National Monument. It is sensitive to frost, so the species is rare in low desert areas, which can be more susceptible to frost. The plant is slow growing, and prefers well-drained soil and full sun. However, when in the seedling stage, it requires shade, and will grow beneath a "nurse tree". It will need this for several years until it grows an adequate root system, which is mostly in the upper 10 cm of soil.

Subspecies
There are two recognized subspecies, the type subspecies, thurberi, is much larger and occurs in southern Arizona, mainland Mexico, and Northern Baja California. It occurs only in southern Baja California.

See also
Organ Pipe Cactus National Monument

References

thurberi
Flora of the Sonoran Deserts
North American desert flora
Flora of Arizona
Flora of Baja California
Flora of Baja California Sur
Flora of Sonora
Flora of Northwestern Mexico
Desert fruits
Cacti of Mexico
Cacti of the United States
Plants described in 1854